The Heroic Pioneers is a 1986 Taiwanese drama film directed by Li Hsing. The film was selected as the Taiwanese entry for the Best Foreign Language Film at the 59th Academy Awards, but was not accepted as a nominee.

Cast
 Chang Ping-yu
 Chang Yuan-ting
 Kuo Chun Chen
 Lily Chen
 Chiu Su-yi
 Fu Bihui
 Ho Ai-yun

See also
 List of submissions to the 59th Academy Awards for Best Foreign Language Film
 List of Taiwanese submissions for the Academy Award for Best Foreign Language Film

References

External links
 

1986 films
1986 drama films
Taiwanese drama films
Mandarin-language films
Films directed by Li Hsing